Peter Oliver (March 26, 1713 – October 12, 1791) was Chief Justice of the Superior Court (the highest court) of the Province of Massachusetts Bay from 1772–1775. He was a Loyalist during the American Revolution, and left Massachusetts in 1776, settling in England.

Early life
Peter Oliver was born in Boston on March 26, 1713, to well known parents. He graduated from Harvard College in 1730. He co-ran a Boston importing business with his brother Andrew for several years, although his interests were in science and literature. Oliver bought an iron works in Middleborough, Massachusetts in 1744. This company made household items made of cast-iron as well as cannonballs. With the profits from this company Oliver built Oliver Hall, described as one of the most elegant residences in all of colonial New England.

Court career
Oliver was appointed Justice of the Peace in 1744, and a justice of the Court of Common Pleas in 1747. He was named a justice of the Massachusetts Superior Court of Judicature in 1756. Oliver supported the idea that colonists should be taxed and more effort should be put into preventing smuggling to pay for the French and Indian War.

Originally starting in 1765, the Sons of Liberty used threats and violence as a tool to manipulate the actions of Peter Oliver and his brother Andrew. Peter Oliver was forced to do things such as refusing to sit in court. Oliver was a strong supporter of the Stamp Act, which caused him to be harassed even further.

Oliver was one of three judges during the trials held after the Boston Massacre. Thomas Hutchinson was pleased with the work that Peter Oliver did, and made him chief justice of the Superior Court in 1772.
Oliver complained often about how low his salary was as chief justice. The British proposed a plan to raise the justice's salary, paid for by the crown. All of the justices declined this offer except for Oliver.  He was impeached in 1774 because of the public outrage against him for doing so. In January, 1776, Oliver, who believed absolutely that the Revolution, which he consistently referred to as the "Rebellion," was illegal and destined to fail, wrote a letter to Massachusetts troops entitled "An Address to the Soldiers of Massachusetts Bay who are now in Arms against the Laws of their Country."  Oliver essentially argues that the Rebellion is illegal and destined to fail and that the Massachusetts troops have been lied to by their officers about the potential for success against Great Britain, which he characterizes as the "mildest government to live under."

Later life
Oliver departed from the colonies when the British evacuated troops and Loyalists from Boston in March 1776. He was named in the Massachusetts Banishment Act of 1778. Oliver sailed first to Nova Scotia and later to England and lived there until his death on October 12, 1795.  In 1781, the year in which Lord Cornwallis surrendered at Yorktown, thereby effectively ending the military struggle in the Colonies, Oliver wrote a bitter denunciation of the Revolution, targeting those who inflamed the populace against the British, entitled "Origin & Progress of the American Rebellion," which is important because Oliver articulates the views of many Loyalists, especially those who were born in the Colonies and lost everything when they fled to Great Britain.  Oliver puts most of the blame on men like Samuel Adams, who, in Oliver's view, instigated an illegal rebellion primarily for economic reasons.

References

 Oliver, Peter (1713-1791) | Encyclopedia.com

1713 births
1791 deaths
British colonial judges in the Americas
Justices of the Massachusetts Superior Court of Judicature
American Loyalists from Massachusetts
People from colonial Boston
Harvard College alumni
Harvard College Loyalists in the American Revolution
People of colonial Massachusetts
Officials impeached by the Thirteen Colonies